Sophie of Mecklenburg-Güstrow (Sophia; 4 September 1557 – 14 October 1631) was Queen of Denmark and Norway by marriage to Frederick II of Denmark. She was the mother of King Christian IV of Denmark and Anne of Denmark. She was Regent of Schleswig-Holstein from 1590 to 1594.

In 1572, she married her cousin, Frederick II of Denmark, and their marriage was remarkably happy. She had little political influence during their marriage, although she maintained her own court and exercised a degree of autonomy over patronages. Sophie developed an interest in astrology, chemistry, alchemy and iatrochemistry, supporting and visiting Tycho Brahe on Ven in 1586 and later. She has later been described as a woman "of great intellectual capacity, noted especially as a patroness of scientists". She became widowed at the age of 31.

Through the skilful management of her vast widowed estate, she amassed an enormous fortune, becoming the richest woman in Northern Europe and the second wealthiest individual in Europe after Maximillian I of Bavaria. Through her "inexhaustible coffers", she financially supported her son, and thereby effectively the entire Danish-Norwegian state. She maintained a large lending business, earning interest, and extending loans to, among others: her son Christian IV, the Danish Council of the Realm, her son-in-law King James VI & I, her grandson Duke Frederick Ulrich of Brunswick-Lüneburg and other German princes. When she died in 1631, James Howell, a 17th-century Anglo-Welsh historian and writer, remarked that she was the "richest Queen in Christendom".

Early life
Born in Wismar, she was the daughter of Duke Ulrich III of Mecklenburg-Güstrow and Princess Elizabeth of Denmark (a daughter of Frederick I and Sophie of Pomerania). Through her father, a grandson of Elizabeth of Denmark, she descended from King John of Denmark. Like Ulrich, she had a great love of knowledge. Later, she would be known as one of the most learned Queens of the time.

Queen
At the age of fourteen Sophie, on 20 July 1572, married Frederick II of Denmark in Copenhagen; he was thirty-eight. She was crowned the following day. They were first half-cousins, through their grandfather, Frederick I, King of Denmark and Norway. They met at Nykøbing Castle, when it had been arranged for the king to meet with Margaret of Pomerania. She was brought to Denmark by Sophie's parents, who decided to also bring their own daughter. Sophie found favour with the king, who betrothed himself to her, and married her six months later. King Frederick had been in love with the noblewoman Anne Corfitzdatter Hardenberg for many years, but was unable to marry her due to her being a noblewoman, not a princess, the opposition of the Danish Privy Council as well as eventually Anne herself.

Despite the age difference between Sophie and Frederick, the marriage was a happy one. Queen Sophie was a loving mother, nursing her children personally during their illnesses. When Frederick was sick with malaria in 1575, she personally nursed him and wrote many worried letters to her father about his progress. King Frederick was well known for being fond of drinking and hunting, but he was a loving spouse to Sophie, writing of her with great fondness in his personal diary (where he kept careful track of where she and their children were in the country) and there is no evidence of extramarital affairs on the part of either spouse. Their marriage is described as having been harmonious. All of their children were sent to live with her parents in Mecklenburg for the first years of their lives, with the possible exception of the last son, Hans, as it was the belief at the time that the parents would indulge their children too much. She showed a keen interest in science and visited the astronomer Tycho Brahe. She was also interested in the old songs of folklore.

Matchmaker 
Around the time of Frederick's death, Sophie's most important function was as a matchmaker for her children. Her daughter, Anne of Denmark, married James VI of Scotland and became queen consort in 1589. She arranged the marriage against the will of the council. When James VI came to Denmark, she gave him a present of 10,000 dalers. She was also deeply involved in the negotiations that led to the wedding of Princess Elizabeth to Henry Julius, Duke of Brunswick-Lüneburg. She oversaw the levying of 150,000 dalers for the two weddings and other expenses, and spent herself 50,000 on jewellery.

In 1596, she arranged the marriage of her daughter Princess Augusta to John Adolf, Duke of Holstein-Gottorp, which improved Denmark’s connections to the north German Lutheran states. Finally, in 1602, she negotiated the marriage of Hedwig to Christian II, Elector of Saxony. She also played a key role in finding appropriate spouses for her younger sons. She was the main negotiator in the marriage arrangements between her son Christian, heir to the throne, and Princess Anne Catherine of Brandenburg, whom Sophie called a "pure pearl".

Widowhood and queen-dowager

Regency
Queen Sophie had no political power during the lifetime of her spouse. When her underage son Christian IV became king in 1588, she was given no place in the regency council in Denmark itself. From 1590, however, she acted as regent for the duchies of Schleswig-Holstein for her son.

She organized a grand funeral for her spouse, arranged for the dowries for her daughters and for her own allowance, all independently and against the will of the council. She engaged in a power struggle with the regents of Denmark and with the Council of State, which had Christian declared of age in 1593. She wished the duchies to be divided between her younger sons, which caused a conflict. Sophie only gave up her position the following year, 1594. In response, Sophie began securing the resources she would need to remain an influential figure within Denmark.

Landowner and successful entrepreneur 

As dowager-queen, Sophie was entitled to 'Dowager-pension' (lit. 'support of life') as well as the castles that comprised her morning gift. These vast estates included Denmark's fourth-largest island Lolland, and the neighbouring island Falster, on which the castle of Nykøbing was situated, which she also received. She also received Aalholm Castle, Halsted Priory, Vennerslund, Ravnsborg, and the fiefs belonging thereto. She succeeded in obtaining 30,000 rigsdaler from her late husband's liquid assets, as well as an annual income of 8,000 rigsdaler from the Sound Dues. Over a number of years, her crown property on Lolland and Falster was expanded, with large properties being transferred to the widow's estate, including Corselitze and Skørringe, whose holdings on Falster totalled over 100 farm estates.

During her long widowhoow, Sophie mainly devoted herself to managing her estates, where she was effectively an independent ruler. She protected the residents of her dowerlands and engaged in large-scale trade and in money-lending. She took a keen interest in new agricultural technology, converted her land to large-scale farming, sold grain and cattle to northern Germany through her large established network in the principalities, built mills and was especially interested in cattle breeding, which was an important source of income during this period. The Dowager Queen Sophie managed her estates in Lolland-Falster so well, that her son could borrow money from her on several occasions for his wars.

She helped to fund her son Christian IV's military campaign against Sweden in 1611, the Kalmar War, and his entry into the Thirty Years War in 1615. Likewise, she also assisted her son with a loan in 1605 of 140,000 Danish rigsdaler, whereupon Christian launched a series of expeditions to Greenland. In 1614, Christian IV took out another loan of 210,000 rigsdaler from his mother. In 1621, the Danish Council of the Realm obtained two loans of 100,000 and 280,000 rigsdaler respectively from the Dowager Queen, to cover the state's deficit. The majority of the Dowager Queen's loans to her son were never repaid.

In 1620-21, Dowager Queen Sophie was the main contributor of a loan of 300,000 rigsdaler from the Danish state under Christian IV, to England under her son-in-law James VI and I. The interest rate was the "extremely favourable" 6%. In addition to her liquid assets amounting to millions of guilders, she also had extensive properties in the north of the Holy Roman Empire, pledged by princely creditors. The queen inspected these estates during her numerous journeys.

Political influence as widow 

Because of her great wealth, Dowager Queen Sophie was able to exercise considerable influence on both Danish domestic affairs and the international politics of Northern Europe during the reign of her son, Christian IV (reigned 1596–1648). During a period from the death of her husband in 1588 until her death forty-three years later, she was active in the political life of Denmark. The queen dowager maintained a constant awareness of the current political developments in Europe and in the empire, through intensive correspondence with Protestant princes and her Mecklenburg relatives.

Domestically, Sophie influenced and supported the realm through continuous financial loans. Correspondence also shows that Sophie engaged in financial discussions with her son about the levying of taxes.

The Dowager Queen also had political influence internationally, as a consequence of her loans to North German principalities. During the Thirty Years’ War, she lent money to several German Protestant princes, and among her creditors was her grandson Duke Frederick Ulrich of Brunswick-Lüneburg, who owed her 300,000 Danish rigsdaler, as well as her son-in-law John Adolf, Duke of Holstein-Gottorp, to whom she also lent 300,000 rigsdaler. She also conducted financial dealings with the leader of the Catholic forces, Count Tilly, with whom she wanted to form a joint creditors' front.

Later life and fortune 
She often visited Mecklenburg, and attended her daughter's wedding in Dresden in 1602. In 1603 she became involved in an inheritance dispute with her uncle, which remained unsolved at his death in 1610. In 1608, she managed to soften the punishment of Rigborg Brockenhuus, and in 1628, she was one of the influential people who prevented her son from having her grandson's lover, Anne Lykke, accused of witchcraft.

When Sophie died in 1631 at Nykøbing Falster, at the age of seventy-four, she was the richest woman in Europe. She left a huge inheritance of about 5.5 million Danish rigsdaler, which was equivalent to approximately 13 times the annual budget surplus of the Danish state, compared to the period 1618-1620.

Burial and inheritence dispute 
At her death, she left three children (Christian, Hedwig and Augusta), four had died before her. All three attended the funeral, "which was conducted with great splendour". Her body was brought from Nykøbing via Vordingborg to Copenhagen, and a solemn funeral service took place in the Church of Our Lady on 13 November 1631. The next day the body was taken to Roskilde Cathedral, and laid to rest in the chapel beside her long-deceased husband.

The Dowager Queen had left no actual testament, but in a letter to her son King Christian, had declared that her three living children should receive a non-distributable portion, the rest to be divided according to law, with the exception of a few bequests.

Upon Sophie's death, a dispute quickly arose over her inheritance. Her grandson, Charles I, immediately sent an ambassador extraordinaire, Robert Sidney, 2nd Earl of Leicester, to the Danish court to offer condolences, and claim part of the inheritance. Sophie's granddaughter, Elizabeth Stuart, Queen of Bohemia, also wanted a part of the inheritance. Unlike her brother Charles, she had not inherited from her mother, Anne of Denmark, and therefore argued that she should receive part of her brother's inheritance from their late grandmother. Initially Charles was accepting of this, but after he found out the vast size of the inheritance, he changed his mind. However, Christian IV quickly appropriated most of the inheritance, claiming that what he had seized only served to pay part of the English debt.

Issue
Sophie and Frederick had seven children:

Ancestry

References

Sources

External links

 Queen Sophie at the website of the Royal Danish Collection
http://www.guide2womenleaders.com/womeninpower/Womeninpower1570.htm

1557 births
1631 deaths
16th-century Danish people
16th-century Norwegian people
16th-century Danish women
17th-century Danish people
17th-century Norwegian people
Burials at Roskilde Cathedral
Danish royal consorts
House of Mecklenburg-Schwerin
Norwegian royal consorts
People from Wismar
16th-century women rulers
Frederick II of Denmark
Queen mothers
Daughters of monarchs